Point Lookout is a hamlet and census-designated place (CDP) located in the town of Hempstead in Nassau County, New York, United States. The population was 1,219 at the time of the 2010 census. The town is mostly made up of residential homes, with several small businesses on Lido Boulevard. The town is surrounded on three sides by water. Today, Point Lookout has become a popular location for summer residences. Among its inhabitants, it is commonly referred to as "PLO".

Geography

Point Lookout is located at the east end of Long Beach Barrier Island. It is adjacent to Lido Beach, which in turn abuts the city of Long Beach, to the west.

Long Beach Barrier Island, which lies between Reynolds Channel and the Atlantic Ocean, was originally formed by glacial deposits and includes a variety of bays, dunes, ponds, marshes, and ocean shoreline, which supports a complex ecosystem that includes a wide variety of flora and fauna. Jones Inlet separates it from Jones Beach Island.

Demographics

At the time of the census of 2000, there were 1,472 people, 616 households, and 413 families residing in the CDP. The population density was 7,379.7 per square mile (2,841.7/km2). There were 792 housing units at an average density of 3,970.6/sq mi (1,529.0/km2). The racial makeup of the CDP was 97.42% White, 0.41% African American, 0.48% Asian, 0.88% from other races, and 0.82% from two or more races. Hispanic or Latino of any race were 2.11% of the population.

There were 616 households, out of which 25.8% had children under the age of 18 living with them, 53.9% were married couples living together, 10.9% had a female householder with no husband present, and 32.8% were non-families. Of all households, 26.9% were made up of individuals, and 12.2% had someone living alone who was 65 years of age or older. The average household size was 2.39 and the average family size was 2.91.

The population was spread out, with 20.8% under the age of 18, 5.6% from 18 to 24, 26.0% from 25 to 44, 29.6% from 45 to 64, and 18.0% who were 65 years of age or older. The median age was 43 years. For every 100 females, there were 94.2 males. For every 100 females aged 18 and over, there were 91.8 males.

The median income for a household in the CDP was $69,821, and the median income for a family was $95,215. Males had a median income of $52,833 versus $37,143 for females. The per capita income for the CDP was $39,953. About 4.6% of families and 12.6% of the population were below the poverty line, including 5.0% of those under age 18 and 2.8% of those aged 65 or over.

History

Point Lookout's first known inhabitants were Merrick (Meroke) Native Americans, a tribe of the Algonquin people. The first European settlers in Point Lookout were Dutch, who arrived in the 1640s, followed by the English, in the 1660s.

The barrier beach on which Point Lookout sits has been, in one incarnation or another, there for hundreds, if not thousands of years. The first mention of Point Lookout begins to appear in the mid-19th century, as a location for whalers, and as a dangerous spot for ships. A U.S. Life Saving Station was established at Point Lookout in 1872; ironically, it was due to the tragic wreck of the U.S.S. Mexico on January 2, 1837, that a U.S. Life Saving Service was created; the service remained there until farmers grew salt hay on the marshes that stretch behind the site.

A series of hotel and seasonal bungalows was built, as was a seasonal railroad connecting Point Lookout to Long Beach, but nearly all these structures were destroyed over time by either winter storms or fire. During the summer months ferries from the Woodcleft Canal in Freeport brought hundreds of day-trippers to Point Lookout's beaches, and for those who lived in Point Lookout, or in the small community to the east called Nassau By the Sea, the barrier island was a paradise.

In 1906, Senator William Reynolds of Brooklyn led a consortium that purchased the entire barrier island. In 1918, Nassau By the Sea was nearly wiped out by the fire. In the 1920s, Senator Reynolds established Point Lookout Inc., which brought in concrete streets and divided the community into small plots which were sold to families for approximately $2,500 a parcel, giving rise to the Point Lookout community. Those bungalows that had not burned in Nassau By the Sea, as well as others from other marsh islands, were moved to Point Lookout and can be seen around the community today.

During the fall and winter of 2018, with the beach undergoing construction, the legendary Pavilion (the “pav”) was torn down.

History

Point Lookout's first known inhabitants were Merrick (Meroke) Native Americans, a tribe of the Algonquin people. The first European settlers in Point Lookout were Dutch, who arrived in the 1640s, followed by the English, in the 1660s.
Point Lookout's first known inhabitants were Merrick (Meroke) Native Americans, a tribe of the Algonquin people. The first European settlers in Point Lookout were Dutch, who arrived in the 1640s, followed by the English, in the 1660s.
Line 97:	Line 98:
In 1906, Senator William Reynolds of Brooklyn led a consortium that purchased the entire barrier island. In 1918, Nassau By the Sea was nearly wiped out by fire. In the 1920s, Senator Reynolds established Point Lookout Inc., which brought in concrete streets and divided the community into small plots which were sold to families for approximately $2,500 a parcel, giving rise to the Point Lookout community. Those bungalows that had not burned in Nassau By the Sea, as well as others from other marsh islands, were moved to Point Lookout and can be seen around the community today.
In 1906, Senator William Reynolds of Brooklyn led a consortium that purchased the entire barrier island. In 1918, Nassau By the Sea was nearly wiped out by fire. In the 1920s, Senator Reynolds established Point Lookout Inc., which brought in concrete streets and divided the community into small plots which were sold to families for approximately $2,500 a parcel, giving rise to the Point Lookout community. Those bungalows that had not burned in Nassau By the Sea, as well as others from other marsh islands, were moved to Point Lookout and can be seen around the community today.

Point Lookout has small homes, densely packed into very small plots, and does not have sanitary or storm sewers.

Restaurants

MO'NELISA is located at 28 Lido Boulevard, Point Lookout, NY 11569.

J.A. Heneghan's Tavern is located at 57 Lido Boulevard, Point Lookout, NY 11569.

Jo Jo Apples Café is located at 85 Lido Boulevard, Point Lookout, NY 11569.

The Point Bar & Grill is located at 70 Lido Boulevard, Point Lookout, NY 11569.

The Buoy Bar is located at 72 Bayside Drive, Point Lookout, NY 11569.

Fisherman's Catch is located at 111 Bayside Drive, Point Lookout, NY 11569.

The Clam Bar is located at 99 Bayside Drive, Point Lookout, NY 11569.

Places of worship
Our Lady of the Miraculous Medal Church is located at 75 Parkside Drive, Point Lookout, NY 11561.

Point Lookout Community Church is located at 60 Freeport Avenue, Point Lookout, NY 11569.

Fire Department
Point Lookout is served by the Point Lookout-Lido Fire Department, founded in 1931. It is located at 102 Lido Boulevard in Point Lookout, NY 11569.

Postal services
The Point Lookout post office is located at 110 Lido Boulevard in Point Lookout, NY 11569-9700. There are no mail delivery services in Point Lookout.

Celebrities
Numerous New York Jets had homes at Point Lookout.  Additionally:

Charles Atlas had a home in Point Lookout
Chris Burke, best known for his role as "Corky" from the Life Goes On TV series, was born in Point Lookout.
Harry Chapin lived in and wrote songs about Point Lookout.
Marlene Dietrich had a home in Point Lookout
Sidney Hillman lived in Point Lookout in his later years.
Burl Ives had a home in Point Lookout
Balaram Stack is a professional surfer from Point Lookout.
Oscar Wilde visited Point Lookout in 1882.

References

External links 
Point Lookout Historical Society
Point Lookout Chamber of Commerce
Point Lookout Civic Association

Census-designated places in Nassau County, New York
Census-designated places in New York (state)
Hamlets in Nassau County, New York
Hamlets in New York (state)
Hempstead, New York
Populated coastal places in New York (state)